The Northlander was a passenger train operated by the provincially-owned Ontario Northland Railway in southwest and northeast Ontario, Canada. In 2012, rail service was discontinued and replaced with express bus service. Rail service will be reinstated in 2026 with an expanded route, greater frequency, new Siemens Venture train sets manufactured by Siemens Mobility Ltd., and various track and station upgrades. The new bi-directional route will run up to seven days a week from Toronto Union Station to Timmins, with an additional new rail connection from Timmins to Cochrane (where passengers can then connect directly to the Polar Bear Express at Cochrane Station) and express bus service from Matheson to Cochrane Station.

Prior to 2012, the Northlander operated six days per week year-round in both directions and connected Cochrane with Toronto. The train typically consisted of one engine, an auxiliary power unit, two coaches and a cafeteria lounge car. It ran on ONR tracks from Cochrane to North Bay and on CN tracks south of North Bay to Toronto.

Plans to resume rail service 
Prior to the 2018 Ontario general election, Doug Ford promised to restore the service. Ontario Northland prepared a business plan and submitted it to the Ministry of Transportation of Ontario in late 2019, and the resumption of the service was mentioned in the province's Draft Transportation Plan for Northern Ontario published in December 2020, although no timeline was provided.

In May 2021, the provincial government announced plans for Ontario Northland and Metrolinx to resume rail operations between Toronto and northeastern Ontario with a 13-stop route to begin service by the mid-2020s. The route would provide service from Toronto to Timmins or Cochrane and would be available between four and seven days a week, based on seasonal travel demands. Two of the proposed stations, Gormley and Langstaff, are not ONR stations from the original Northlander route but they are serving GO Transit Richmond Hill line. Stations south of North Bay to Washago and south of Cochrane would need to be restored as they have either become inactive or adapted for other uses.

In April 2022, Ontario's Progressive Conservative government announced it has earmarked $75 million to restore the Northlander passenger rail service to northeastern Ontario. President and CEO of Ontario Northland Corina Moore said the money will be split over the next three years. She said it will look after passenger coaches, infrastructure and stations. The province said it continues to eye an in-service date of 2025. They said that the service will be offered on seasonal travel demands and will range from four and seven days a week between northern Ontario and Toronto.

On December 15, 2022, The Ontario Government revealed that it had purchased three trainsets from Siemens Mobility for use on the Northlander, each comprising a Charger locomotive and two Venture coaches and a cab car operating in a push-pull configuration on trains between Toronto and Timmins.

Stations
The Northlander made scheduled stops at the following stations:

Former stations

Service to Barrie and Orillia ended in 1992 when the Northlander was rerouted to the Bala subdivision. Before the former TEE trainsets were retired, Barrie and Orillia were typically served in one direction only to avoid turning the train in Toronto; routing a giant loop around Lake Simcoe. Newer ex-GO Transit cars were bi-directional. That corresponding section of the Newmarket subdivision was abandoned, then tracks removed by the Canadian National Railway in 1996. The old line is now Oro-Medonte Rail Trail, Barrie North Shore Trail and Barrie Waterfront Heritage Trail.

Dream Catcher Express
The Dream Catcher Express was a seasonal passenger rail service that ran annually over a period of six days from the end of September to the beginning of October.

Train sets consisted of several single deck cars, a dining car, and a dome car.

The service was by reservation only and provided one run per day. Trains departed in the morning and returned in the early evening. The Dream Catcher Express allowed passengers to view the fall colours in Northern Ontario.

This service, along with the Northlander, ended in 2012.

References

External links
 Official Website for the former Northlander service discontinued in 2012
 Northlander Passenger Rail Updates for the future reinstatement of the Northlander
 Dream Catcher Express
 Northeastern Ontario Rail Network
 Committee Promoting Muskoka Rail Travel
 Transport Action Ontario

Ontario Northland Railway
Named passenger trains of Ontario
Cochrane, Ontario
Railway services introduced in 1976
Passenger rail transport in Toronto
Rail transport in Simcoe County
Rail transport in the District Municipality of Muskoka
Rail transport in Bracebridge, Ontario
History of rail transport in Parry Sound District
History of rail transport in Nipissing District
Rail transport in North Bay, Ontario
Rail transport in Temagami
Rail transport in Timiskaming District
Transport in Cobalt, Ontario
Transport in Temiskaming Shores
Rail transport in Cochrane District
Transport in Cochrane, Ontario

Railway services discontinued in 2012